Kokoszki is a PKP railway station in Kokoszki (Pomeranian Voivodeship), Poland.

Lines crossing the station

References 
Kokoszki article at Polish stations database, URL accessed at 17 March 2006

Railway stations in Gdańsk
Railway stations in Poland opened in 1914